The following is a list of the first openly LGBT (lesbian, gay, bisexual or transgender) holders of elected or appointed political office in Canada.  

LGBT people have served at all three main levels of political office in Canada: municipal, provincial and federal. As of 2022, every Canadian province and territory has been represented by at least one out LGBTQ officeholder.

In addition to the milestones noted below, Canada has also had a number of prominent politicians who were not out as LGBT during their careers in politics, either coming out after they retired or being officially outed only in posthumous biographical sources, as well as openly LGBT politicians whose election or appointment to office was not a historically significant first as other LGBT people had already held the same office before them. For a more thorough list of Canadian LGBTQ politicians regardless of whether they represented historic firsts or not, see also List of LGBT politicians in Canada.

First overall
 First openly gay political candidate, regardless of electoral status: Peter Maloney ran for a seat on the Toronto Board of Education in the 1972 Toronto municipal election as an openly gay candidate. (He had previously been an Ontario Liberal Party candidate in St. George in the 1971 Ontario provincial election, and some later biographical sources have stated that he ran as an openly gay candidate at that time as well, but no indication of his sexuality is seen in any media coverage of the 1971 election. The first known coverage of Maloney which makes any reference to his sexuality is of a party policy conference in early 1972, several months after the election was over.) Robert Douglas Cook, a Gay Alliance Toward Equality candidate for the electoral district of West Vancouver-Howe Sound in the 1979 British Columbia provincial election, has been credited with this distinction by some media outlets, but was in fact merely the first to run as a candidate of an explicitly gay-identified political organization rather than a traditional political party or for a non-partisan office. 

 First transgender candidate, regardless of electoral status: Jamie Lee Hamilton ran for Vancouver's Parks Board in 1996. Christin Milloy, an Ontario Libertarian Party candidate in the 2011 provincial election in Ontario, was the first transgender candidate in a provincial election. Jennifer McCreath, a Strength in Democracy candidate in Avalon in the 2015 federal election, was the first transgender candidate in a federal election. Trevor Kirczenow was Liberal candidate in Provencher in the 2019 federal election, becoming the first openly transgender candidate nominated by a major party in a federal election.

 First openly gay person elected to office: Raymond Blain (Montreal City Council, 1986) is commonly credited with this distinction, although Maurice Richard, who was elected to the National Assembly of Quebec in 1985 after coming out as gay sometime during his term as mayor of Bécancour, Quebec from 1976 to 1985, predated him and the story was simply not picked up by national media until later on. Out lesbian Sue Harris won election to the Vancouver Parks Board in 1984. Jim Egan (Comox-Strathcona Regional District board, 1981) may also have predated all of them, although sources are unclear on whether he ran as an openly gay candidate at the time.

 First transgender person elected to office: Julie Lemieux was elected to the municipal council of Très-Saint-Rédempteur in the 2013 municipal election, and later ran for and won the mayoralty of the village in the subsequent 2017 municipal election. Although reported as a lesbian-identified woman at the time of their election to the Legislative Assembly of Alberta in 2015, Estefan Cortes-Vargas came out as non-binary in an assembly debate later in the year.

Federal

Parliament
 Member of Parliament: 
Male: Svend Robinson – elected 1979 [Came out: 1988]
Female: Libby Davies – elected 1997 [Came out: 2001]
Two-spirit: Blake Desjarlais (NDP) - elected 2021 
Already out at first election: Bill Siksay – 2004
 Senator: 
Male: Laurier LaPierre – 2001
Female: Nancy Ruth – 2005

At least two federal MPs who predated Robinson, Heward Grafftey and Charles Lapointe, and one who was first elected alongside him in 1979, Ian Waddell, are known to have come out as gay or bisexual after their retirement from politics.

By provincial delegation
As of 2015, seven of Canada's ten provinces have elected at least one LGBT MP to the House of Commons or had an LGBT senator appointed from their province.

 British Columbia
Male: Svend Robinson, MP (NDP) – elected 1979 [Came out: 1988]
Female: Libby Davies, MP  (NDP) – elected 1997 [Came out: 2001]
Already out at first election: Bill Siksay, MP (NDP) – 2004
 Nova Scotia
Scott Brison, MP (Progressive Conservative, later Liberal) – elected 1997 [Came out: 2002]
 Ontario
Mario Silva, MP (Liberal) – 2004
 Senator Nancy Ruth (Progressive Conservative, later Conservative) – 2005
 Quebec
 Senator Laurier LaPierre (Liberal) – 2001
 Réal Ménard, MP (Bloc Québécois) – elected 1993 [Came out: 1994]
 Saskatchewan
Sheri Benson, MP (NDP) – 2015
 Alberta
Randy Boissonnault, MP (Liberal) – 2015
Two-spirit: Blake Desjarlais, MP (NDP) - elected 2021
 Newfoundland and Labrador
 Seamus O'Regan, MP (Liberal) – 2015

Cabinet
 Federal cabinet minister: Scott Brison – 2004

Parties
 Leader of a federal political party: Chris Lea (Green) – 1990
 Deputy leader of a federal political party represented in Parliament: Libby Davies (NDP) – 2007

Provincial and territorial
To date, only New Brunswick has never had a person serve in its provincial legislature who was out as gay during their term in office, although Richard Hatfield was outed as gay after his death.

The provinces of British Columbia, Alberta, Manitoba, Ontario, Nova Scotia and Quebec and the territory of Yukon have had more than one LGBT member, and all except Nova Scotia have had both gay men and lesbian women serve in the legislatures; Nova Scotia to date has only elected LGBTQ women, with no out gay men yet serving in the legislature. The other provinces and territories which have had out LGBT legislators have had only one each to date. Alberta, Manitoba and Ontario have had elected MLAs who identified as non-binary.

Some figures, including Ian Scott, Keith Norton, Phil Gillies and Dominic Agostino in Ontario, Claude Charron and Guy Joron in Quebec and Andrew Thomson in Saskatchewan, predated the firsts listed here but were not out to the general public during their time in politics.

To date, most LGBT people who have served in provincial or territorial legislatures have represented urban districts in larger cities, while very few have ever served in a purely rural district.

 Lieutenant Governor
Brenda Murphy (New Brunswick) - 2019
 Provincial Premier
Female: Kathleen Wynne (Ontario) – 2013 (First female premier of Ontario, first openly LGBT premier in Canada)
Male: Wade MacLauchlan (Prince Edward Island) – 2015
One provincial premier, Richard Hatfield in New Brunswick, predated Wynne but was not out as gay during his political career, instead being outed only after his death.
 Provincial Deputy Premier
Male: George Smitherman (Ontario) (Ontario Liberal Party) – 2006
 Provincial cabinet minister: 
British Columbia - Tim Stevenson – 2000
Quebec - André Boisclair - 2002
Ontario - George Smitherman – 2003
Manitoba - Jim Rondeau - 2004
Nova Scotia - Joanne Bernard - 2013
Alberta - Ricardo Miranda - 2016
 Leader of a provincial party: Allison Brewer (New Brunswick New Democratic Party) – 2005
 Leader of a provincial party with seats in a legislature: André Boisclair (Parti Québécois) – 2005
 Provincial and territorial legislators:
British Columbia
Male: Mike Farnworth, 1991 (came out during leadership run in 2010); Ted Nebbeling and Tim Stevenson, 1996 (both out when elected)
Female: Jenn McGinn, 2008
Alberta
Male: Michael Connolly and Ricardo Miranda, 2015
Genderqueer: Estefan Cortes-Vargas, 2015 Cortes-Vargas publicly identified as a lesbian woman at the time of their election to the legislature, and came out as non-binary during a debate in the legislature later in the year.
Female: Janis Irwin, 2019
Manitoba
Male: Jim Rondeau, 1999
Female: Jennifer Howard, 2007
Genderqueer: Uzoma Asagwara, 2019
Ontario
Male: George Smitherman, 1999
Male: Terence Kernaghan, 2018
Female: Kathleen Wynne, 2003
Non-binary: Kristyn Wong-Tam, 2022
Bisexual: Suze Morrison, elected 2018, came out 2021
Quebec
Male: Maurice Richard and André Boulerice, 1985
Female: Agnès Maltais, 2003 (came out)
Newfoundland and Labrador: Gerry Rogers, 2011
Nova Scotia 
Female: Joanne Bernard, 2013
Genderqueer: Lisa Lachance, 2021
Prince Edward Island: Wade MacLauchlan, 2015
Saskatchewan
Nathaniel Teed, 2022
Yukon
Male: Dale Eftoda, 2001
Female: Emily Tredger, 2021
Northwest Territories: Julie Green, 2015
Nunavut: Janet Brewster - elected 2021, came out 2022

Municipal

Overall firsts

Mayors
 Mayor of any municipality: Maurice Richard served as mayor of Bécancour, Quebec from 1975 to 1985. Contemporary biographical sources indicate that he came out as gay sometime during his mayoralty, but are not clear about when; it is known, however, that he was out as gay by the time of his campaign for election to the National Assembly of Quebec in 1985. After serving in the provincial legislature from 1985 to 1994 as its first openly LGBT member, he was reelected to another stint as mayor of Bécancour in 1995.
 Mayor of a major city: Glen Murray (Winnipeg) – 1998 (credited as first openly gay major of a major city in North America)
 Transgender mayor: Julie Lemieux was elected mayor of Très-Saint-Rédempteur in the 2017 municipal election.

One mayor, Charlotte Whitton in Ottawa (1951–56, 1961–64), has been the subject of unresolved debate about her sexual orientation. Whitton spent much of her adult life in a Boston marriage-style living arrangement with another woman, Margaret Grier; in 1999, 24 years after Whitton's death, the National Archives of Canada publicly released many intimate personal letters between Whitton and Grier. The release of these papers sparked much debate in the Canadian media about whether Whitton and Grier's relationship could be characterized as lesbian, or merely as an emotionally intimate friendship between two unmarried women. Whitton never publicly identified herself as lesbian during her lifetime, and thus could not be considered Canada's first out LGBT mayor regardless of the status of her relationship with Grier.

City councillors
 First city councillor: At the last caretaker meeting of Tecumseh, Ontario's municipal council following the 1980 municipal elections, outgoing councillor and unsuccessful mayoral candidate Cameron Frye acknowledged that he was gay. The campaign had been marked by rumours about Frye's sexuality, including the distribution of hate literature claiming that Frye would promote a "gay lifestyle" as mayor and would lead the town into "moral decay", although Frye refused to confirm or deny the claims about his sexuality during the campaign. Frye was first elected to the municipal council in 1972.
 First city councillor already out at first election: Raymond Blain (Montreal), 1986

School Board Trustee

 First trans school board trustee: Lyra Evans was elected in October 2018.

By province

Alberta
 City councillor in Edmonton: 
Male: Michael Phair – 1992
Female: Sherry McKibben - 1994
 City councillor in Red Deer: Paul Harris - 2010
 City councillor in Calgary: Jeromy Farkas - 2017

British Columbia
 City Councillor in Trail: Paul Butler - 2018 to present
 City councillor in Vancouver: 
Male: Gordon Price – 1986
Female: Ellen Woodsworth – 2002
 City councillor in Esquimalt: Randall Garrison - 2008
 City councillor in Cumberland: Conner Copeman - 2011
 City councillor in Victoria: Sarah Potts-Halpin - 2018
Mayor of Whistler: Ted Nebbeling - 1990 to 1996

Manitoba
 City councillor in Winnipeg: Glen Murray – 1989

New Brunswick
 Mayor of Caraquet: Kevin Haché - 2012
 Municipal Councillor in Quispamsis:                   Noah Donovan — 2021.

Newfoundland and Labrador
 Deputy mayor in Harbour Grace, Newfoundland and Labrador: Sonia Williams — 2013
 Municipal councillor in Wabana, Bell Island: Donovan Taplin — 2013. 
 Transgender municipal councillor: Charlotte Gauthier, Gillams - 2020

Nova Scotia
 City councillor in Halifax -  Krista Snow - 2003
 Municipal Councillor in Region of Queens - Brian Fralic - 2012
 Mayor of Cape Breton Regional Municipality: Cecil Clarke - elected 2012 [Came out: 2018]

Ontario

 Brant: David Bailey - mayor, elected 2018
 Barrie: Keenan Aylwin - city councillor, elected 2018
 Fort Frances: Douglas Judson - town councillor, elected 2018
 Goderich: Kevin Morrison - mayor, elected 2014
 Hamilton: Aidan Johnson - city councillor, elected 2014
 North Dundas: Eric Duncan - mayor; elected 2010, came out 2017 
 Ottawa: 
Male: Alex Munter (Kanata) and Stéphane Émard-Chabot – city councillors, elected 1994
Non-Binary: Catherine McKenney - city councillor, elected 2014
Mayor: Jim Watson - elected 2010, came out 2019
 Tillsonburg: Mark Renaud - city councillor, elected 2003
 Toronto: 
Male: Kyle Rae – city councillor, elected 1991
Female: Kristyn Wong-Tam – city councillor, elected 2010

Quebec
 City councillor in Montreal:
Male: Raymond Blain - 1986

Saskatchewan
 City councillor in Prince Albert:
 Male: Evert Botha - 2016
 City councillor in Saskatoon:
 Male: Darren Hill – 2006
 Female: Lenore Swystun – 2000
 Mayor of La Ronge: Colin Ratushniak - 2020
 Town Councillor in Biggar: Dakota Ekman - 2020

See also
 List of lesbian, gay, bisexual, or transgender firsts by year
 List of the first LGBT holders of political offices
 List of the first LGBT holders of political offices in the United States
 List of the first LGBT holders of political offices in the United Kingdom

References

 
Canada
LGBT history in Canada
Lists of Canadian politicians